Scorpaenopsis cacopsis, Jenkin's scorpionfish, is a species of venomous marine ray-finned fish belonging to the family Scorpaenidae, the scorpionfishes. This species is found around Hawaii.

Size

References

cacopsis
Taxa named by Oliver Peebles Jenkins
Fish described in 1901